Goričan is a municipality in Međimurje County, Croatia.

Goričan is the only village belonging to the municipality. Its population in the 2011 census was 2,823. Of the entire population, 2,763 people identified themselves as Croats.

Goričan is located in the eastern part of Međimurje County, near the Croatian-Hungarian border and the Mura. The nearby populated places include the villages of Donji Kraljevec and Hodošan in Međimurje County, as well as the town of Letenye in Hungary. The border checkpoint between Goričan and Letenye is located around 3 kilometres from the centre of the village. The border checkpoint is also the place where the Croatian A4 motorway becomes the Hungarian M7 motorway, or the other way around.

The nearby Stadium Milenium is a speedway stadium and hosts the Speedway Grand Prix of Croatia.

References

External links
The official website of the municipality 

Municipalities of Croatia
Croatia–Hungary border crossings
Populated places in Međimurje County